Neonatal Network: The Journal of Neonatal Nursing is a bimonthly peer-reviewed healthcare journal on neonatal nursing. It is the official journal of the Academy of Neonatal Nursing and is published by Springer Publishing. Neonatal Network was established in 1981. , the editor-in-chief is Debbie Fraser.

Abstracting and indexing 
Neonatal Network is indexed or abstracted in CINAHL, Web of Science ESCI, the International Nursing Index, Index Medicus, and RNdex Top 100.

See also
 List of nursing journals

References

External links
 

Pediatric nursing journals
Publications established in 1981
Bimonthly journals
English-language journals
Springer Publishing academic journals